National Tertiary Route 906, or just Route 906 (or ) is a National Road Route of Costa Rica, located in the Guanacaste province. It is a road in the Nicoya Peninsula, it starts and ends at Route 150.

Description
Currently a gravel road, Route 906 runs in parallel to Route 150 to the west. The route visits the towns of Piave, Corralillo and San Lázaro.

In Guanacaste province the route covers Nicoya canton (San Antonio district).

History
In late 2019 a pilot program with a new and cheaper asphalt paving procedure, using recycled materials, was put in place with initial tests over this gravel road.

References

Highways in Costa Rica